Kilmarnock  (meaning "Marnock's church") is a large town and former burgh in East Ayrshire, Scotland and is the administrative centre of East Ayrshire Council. With a population of 46,770, Kilmarnock is the 14th most populated settlement in Scotland and the largest town in Ayrshire. The town is continuous to nearby neighbouring villages Crookedholm and Hurlford to the east, and Kilmaurs to the west of the town. It includes former villages subsumed by the expansion of the town such as Bonnyton and new purpose built suburbs such as New Farm Loch. The town and the surrounding Greater Kilmarnock area is home to 32 listed buildings and structures designated by Historic Environment Scotland.

The River Irvine runs through the eastern section of Kilmarnock, and the Kilmarnock Water passes through it, giving rise to the name 'Bank Street'. The first collection of work by Scottish poet Robert Burns, Poems, Chiefly in the Scottish Dialect, was published in Kilmarnock in 1786 by John Wilson, printer and bookseller and became known as the Kilmarnock Edition. The internationally distributed whisky brand Johnnie Walker originated in the town in the 19th century and until 2012 was still bottled and packaged in the town at the Johnnie Walker Hill Street plant. Protest and backing from the Scottish Government took place in 2009, after Diageo, the owner of Johnnie Walker, announced plans to close the bottling plant in the town after 189 years.

Kilmarnock is home to Kilmarnock Academy, one of a small number of schools in the UK, and the only school in Scotland, to have educated several Nobel Prize Laureates – Sir Alexander Fleming, discoverer of Penicillin, and The 1st Baron Boyd-Orr, for his scientific research into nutrition and his work as the first Director-General of the United Nations Food and Agriculture Organization (FAO).

History 

In 1592, King James VI of Scotland granted a charter to Thomas, Lord Boyd, erecting Kilmarnock into a burgh of barony. The charter confirms that the Boyd family to be in possession of the land of Kilmarnock and assures any future line of succession. At the beginning of the 16th century, Kilmarnock was described as "a large village and of great repair" with nearby Kilmaurs notably larger than Kilmarnock. However, over the course of the next one hundred years, the expansion of Kilmarnock was evident. Its expansion led to Kilmarnock becoming larger than Kilmaurs and becoming Ayrshire's largest inland centre and challenging the supremacy of the royal burghs of Ayr and Irvine. During the 19th century, due to the growing rate of expansion due to the industrial expansion, Kilmarnock's population growth increased significantly from 6,000 in 1800, 21,000 in 1851 and 35,000 by 1901.

Although never granted the title of royal burgh, largely due to its geography as an inland settlement with no port to enhance trade at sea, Kilmarnock, as a parliamentary burgh was ranked as equal to other nearby royal burghs such as Ayr and Irvine. Its close proximity to Troon and its harbour helped Kilmarnock's trade and economy and its reputation of a strong and important burgh despite its inland position. Goods such as coal was frequently transported from Kilmarnock to Troon for export, and by 1812 a new railway line between Kilmarnock and Troon was constructed to allow trade to flow from the town much easier. The line opened in 1812, and was the first railway in Scotland to obtain an authorising Act of Parliament; it would soon also become the first railway in Scotland to use a steam locomotive; the first to carry passengers; and the River Irvine bridge, Laigh Milton Viaduct, is the earliest railway viaduct in Scotland. It was a plateway, using L-shaped iron plates as rails, to carry wagons with flangeless wheels. In 1841, when more modern railways had developed throughout the West of Scotland, the line was converted from a plateway to a railway and realigned in places. The line became part of the Glasgow and South Western Railway system. Much of the original route is part of the present-day Kilmarnock to Barassie railway line, although the extremities of the original line have been lost.

When elected county councils were created in 1890 under the Local Government (Scotland) Act 1889, the burgh of Kilmarnock was deemed capable of running its own affairs and so was excluded from the jurisdiction of Ayrshire County Council. Further local government reform in 1930 brought the burgh within the area controlled by Ayrshire County Council, but classed as a large burgh, which allowed the town to continue to run many local services itself. Kilmarnock Town Council was based at the Town Hall at 28 King Street, which was built in 1805 and demolished in the 1970s.

The growth of Kilmarnock in population and geographical area swallowed up the old separate village communities
of Beansburn, Bonnyton, and Riccarton. This led to such communities and villages around the town losing their identities due to the process of rehousing people who were dispersed to the new housing schemes. These large new housing areas lacked adequate shopping and recreational facilities, and most of them were not within convenient walking distance of the old town centre.

This expansion led to the town becoming a major centre in the west of Scotland. In 1945 an attempt by the Burgh Council of Kilmarnock to cope with increasing traffic was made by removing the statue of Sir James Shaw and re-developing the Cross into a roundabout. Shortly after, a one-way traffic system was introduced around the town centre which is still in use today as of June 2022.

By 1973, an outer-town bypass was formed to take away the heavy through traffic that had been travelling in and throughout the town. In 1974, the Foregate pedestrianised shopping area was opened, to be followed by a new bus station, a multistorey car park, a civic centre, and a re-shaped central precinct for the town: a fitting memorial to a form of municipal government which passed away in 1975, after serving Kilmarnock well in its 400 years as a burgh.

The name Kilmarnock comes from the Gaelic cill (cell), and the name of Saint Marnock or Mernoc who is also remembered in the name of Portmarnock in Ireland and Inchmarnock. It may come from the three Gaelic elements mo, 'my', Ernán (name of the saint) and the diminutive ag, giving Church of My Little Ernán. According to tradition, the saint founded a church there in the 7th century. There are 12 Church of Scotland congregations in the town, plus other denominations. In 2005, the Reverend David W. Lacy, minister of the town's Henderson Church, was elected Moderator of the General Assembly of the Church of Scotland.

The core of the early town appears to have lain around what is now the Laigh Kirk, Kilmarnock (Low Church), although the oldest parts of the current building are no earlier than the 17th century, extending north and northwest. In 1668 the town was largely destroyed by an accidental fire. About 120 families lost most of their possessions and were forced to live destitute in the fields surrounding the town. These tradespeople had no other way of making a living and had already been driven to the edge of poverty by having troops stationed with them as part of the anti-Covenanter measures. Parish churches throughout Scotland collected money for the relief of these homeless citizens.

A comparatively modest settlement until the Industrial Revolution, Kilmarnock extended considerably from around 1800 onwards, requiring the opening of King Street, Portland Street, and Wellington Street. Added later was John Finnie Street, which is regarded  as "one of the finest Victorian planned streets in Scotland." The Sandbed Street Bridge is the oldest known surviving bridge in the area.

The Titchfield Street drill hall was completed in 1914.

Government

Political overview

Kilmarnock, as part of the Kilmarnock and Loudoun parliamentary constituency, had long been considered a "safe seat" for the Scottish Labour Party, having been represented by a Labour MP since the establishment of the constituency in 1983. However, in the 2015 General Election, for the first time since 1983, the seat changed hands from Labour to the Scottish National Party with the election of Alan Brown. The Member of Parliament (MP) for the Kilmarnock and Loudoun constituency area in the Westminster parliament is Kilmarnock-born Alan Brown. Brown defeated Labour candidate Cathy Jamieson with an overwhelming majority with Brown receiving 30,000 votes with Jamieson only receiving 16,363. The member of the Scottish Parliament (MSP) for Kilmarnock is Willie Coffey.

In the Scottish Parliament, the town, as part of the Kilmarnock and Irvine Valley constituency, is represented by Willie Coffey who has represented the seat since the 2007 Scottish Parliamentary elections. Similar to the voting pattern shown at UK General Elections, in the Scottish Parliament elections, Kilmarnock had always been seen as a safe seat for Labour with an MSP representing the area since the parliament's re-establishment in 1999.

Kilmarnock is the home of the East Ayrshire Council Chambers and offices situated on the London Road.

In local council elections, Kilmarnock comprises four wards: Kilmarnock North, Kilmarnock East and Hurlford, Kilmarnock West and Crosshouse, and Kilmarnock South.

The leader in East Ayrshire is Douglas Reid of the SNP party, who has been leader since 2007. The chief executive is Fiona Lees. Following the 2017 East Ayrshire Council election, the SNP formed a minority government for East Ayrshire, following the result of a hung council. At present, the Scottish Labour party is the opposition in the East Ayrshire parliament with their leader, Maureen McKay alongside the Scottish Conservative Party, independent councillors and one councillor elected from local campaign group party, The Rubbish Party.

Councillors

Economy 

The economy of Kilmarnock has historically been centred around heavy manufacturing and goods based services. However, in recent years, and in trend with other towns and cities across Scotland, Kilmarnock's economic dependence has shifted from manufacturing and instead become more reliant on skills-based knowledge. Companies such as Vodafone (Teleperformance Call Centre) occupying a large part of the Rowallan Business Park Centre which is also home to Food Partners, a nationwide sandwich franchise. Local property redevelopment and regeneration company, The KLIN Group occupies the former Andrew Barclay Sons & Co offices in West Langland Street, Brodie Engineering operate two production factories for locomotives in the town centre and Utopia Computers, one of the UK's fastest growing computer companies also have their headquarters and main site situated in Kilmarnock in High Glencairn Street.
Kilmarnock's traditional industries were based around textiles and heavy engineering such as locomotives (Andrew Barclay Sons & Co) from 1837, and valves (Glenfield and Kennedy), which are still in production. The firm is now trading as Glenfield Valves and still operates a base from Kilmarnock.

Carpets manufactured in Kilmarnock were internationally known for their quality and intricacy since the late 19th century. Carpets were made by Blackwood & Morton in Kilmarnock from the early 20th century.  Many locations around the world chose to install BMK Carpets. Carpet-making finally ceased in Kilmarnock in early 2005 following the closure of Stoddard Carpets and at this time, Stoddard Carpets was the oldest carpet manufacturing company still in operation at that time in Scotland.

Archibald Finnie and his family lived at Springhill House (now a nursing home) near the Grange Academy. They owned many coal mines, pits and other companies in Springside and other places. John Finnie Street is named after one of the family. Shoes were also a major product for some time: Saxone had a factory in the town on the site where the Galleon Leisure Centre now stands and was the largest shoe production factory in operation in Scotland with a staff base of 1,000 employees at the plants peak. Kilmarnock had one of the earliest tram railways in the world, running to Troon over the (recently restored) Laigh Milton viaduct. The Glasgow & South Western Railway set up their works here, producing nearly 400 locomotives by the time it was absorbed by the London, Midland & Scottish Railway in 1923. Some work continued, but heavy repairs were sent to St Rollox. Locomotive repairs finished in 1952, and the works closed in 1959. Nevertheless, locomotives are still made by Brodie Engineering, as well as the maintenance of existing diesel and electric multiple units. From 1949 self-propelled combine harvesters were built in Kilmarnock in a large Massey-Harris factory on the outskirts of the town. It later became Massey Ferguson, and closed in 1978. Glenfield and Kennedy still survives, albeit with a fraction of its former workforce, which at its height numbered in the thousands.

Kilmarnock is the original home of Scotch whisky brand Johnnie Walker which was originally known as Walker's Kilmarnock Whisky when the brand first started trading from the town in the mid-1800s. The Johnnie Walker brand is a legacy left by John ‘Johnnie’ Walker after he started to sell whisky in his grocer's shop in Ayrshire, Scotland. In 1908, when James Stevenson was the managing director, there was a re-branding of sorts. The whisky was renamed from Walker's Kilmarnock Whiskies to Johnnie Walker Whisky. In addition, the slogan, "Born 1820 – Still going Strong!" was created, along with the Striding Man, a figure used in their advertisements to this day. In 2009, to much public backlash as well as backlash from the Scottish Government, First Minister of Scotland Alex Salmond and local MP and MSP Cathy Jamieson and Willie Coffey, the owner of Johnnie Walker, Diageo, decided to close the bottling plant, originally by the end of 2011, ending the link between the whisky brand and the town. In September 2009, Diageo confirmed the plant in Kilmarnock would close, despite local protests. Production of Johnnie Walker in Kilmarnock ceased during March 2012, after 192 years. It is now made at a new Diageo bottling plant in the eastern coast of Scotland in Leven, Fife. Over the years, Kilmarnock has been the home to other well-known companies, Andrew Barclay Sons & Co., and Saxone Shoes. Saxone Shoes was bought by the British Sears group and became defunct when Sears sold it to Stylo.  Andrew Barclay Son's & Co still manufactures in the town but is now owned by  Wabtec (Wabtec Rail Scotland).

Kilmarnock is home to The HALO Urban Regeneration with a focus on digital learning, inspiration to innovative thinking and providing a conducive environment for spin-out, new-start, scale-ups, digital, manufacturing and cyber businesses. HALO is set to provide £205 million of Gross Domestic Product (GDP) to the Economy of Scotland. The window and door company, Scotia have their main headquarters in Kilmarnock, as well as a manufacturing and production plant.

Regeneration 

The textile and manufacturing sectors across Scotland suffered significant decline in the post-war period and in particular from the 1960s, in the face of greater foreign competition. Kilmarnock was no exception, with the closure or significant reduction of many of its traditional large employers: Glenfield and Kennedy, Massey Ferguson, BMK and Saxone. Although significant attempts have been made to halt this decline and attract new employers, Kilmarnock saw a continuing net loss of jobs in the five years to 2005. Although traditionally a main shopping area for most of the surrounding districts, patterns have changed over the last 20 years; traditional centres such as Ayr have been joined by new developments at Braehead and East Kilbride. This difficult economic climate is most visible in the town centre, the eastern part of which has been extensively redeveloped, with important historic buildings such as King Street Church and the town hall being demolished and Duke Street (the link from Kilmarnock Cross to the Palace Theatre and out to the London Road) built over.

More recently Portland Street, which formed the northerly part of the main shopping area, lay abandoned for many years due to a decline in retail trade and in the face of possible comprehensive redevelopment. The street has now been redeveloped, but has not yet regained its former degree of popularity, with a Gala Bingo and a J D Wetherspoon's taking up much of one side of the street and the rest largely occupied by chain stores. In 2004, the Rough Guide to Scotland described the town as "shabby and depressed, saddled with some terrible shopping centres and a grim one-way system". The town, however, contains several parks such as Howard Park, Dean Park and Kay Park, and residential areas including London Road, Dundonald Road, McLelland Drive and Howard Park Drive. The town also boasts a collection of gift shops, cafes, bars and restaurants within the very desirable Bank Street area. There are retail parks at Queen's Drive and Glencairn Square.

According to the local press in November 2007, the new SNP council have drawn up a Top Ten Hit List on 'eyesore' buildings in the town and their owners, and have revealed plans to crack down hard on property owners who have left their buildings fall into disrepair. Action is being taken to do something with each of these sites. Many of the buildings in disrepair are irreplaceable listed buildings such as the former ABC cinema (previously the King's Theatre) on Titchfield Street. Plans to improve the derelict building at the top of John Finnie Street that was destroyed by a fire in the late 1980s have been submitted to include a council office retaining the original façade. Work is estimated to be completed in 2012. A four-star hotel recently opened next to Rugby Park, the home of Kilmarnock F.C., and new restaurants, such as Merchants and the Jefferson Restaurant, have opened in the town centre.

Regeneration activities have been discussed for Kilmarnock town centre; in early 2006, an application to Historic Scotland's Conservation Area Regeneration Scheme was successful, and in July 2006 an application under the Heritage Lottery Fund's Townscape Heritage Initiative Scheme was pending. Work has finished on a quality housing development on the site of the former Kilmarnock Infirmary, north of the town centre. In the past there have been major efforts to improve the quality of life for residents in the town's worst housing estates, especially in parts of Shortlees, Longpark and Onthank. Much new quality housing has been constructed on the northern fringes of the town for commuters. With a journey time of 20 minutes from Kilmarnock to Glasgow (roughly half that of the existing train service), the M77 motorway, an upgrade in 2005 of the A77, has transformed the journey between Glasgow and Kilmarnock. Recent house price increases have reflected this.

Transport 

 

In 1812, the Kilmarnock and Troon Railway opened, mainly to carry coal from the area to the harbour at Troon, but also carrying passengers. In 1904, Kilmarnock built its own tramway system, the Kilmarnock Corporation Tramways. An electric power station was built on the south bank of the River Irvine at Riccarton. Overhead power lines and tram lines were laid. With continued upgrading and expansion, the tram network at its peak went from Ayr Road in Riccarton at its southerly point, to Knockinlaw Road in Beansburn in the north. A recent development has been the regeneration of Kilmarnock Railway Station under the umbrella of the Kilmarnock Railway Station Heritage Trust. Additions to the station facilities include a Scottish gift shop, a vegan deli and an Active Travel HUB where members of the public can access advice on travelling more sustainability. The HUB also offers led walks and cycle rides. Despite an expensive upgrade in 2008, it was announced in December 2022 following a full cabinet meeting of East Ayrshire Council that the station clock at the Kilmarnock railway station was to be removed and landscaped "with immediate affect" due to continuous technical difficulties preventing the clock and its LED lighting from working properly.

At Kilmarnock Cross, the line had an easterly spur that stretched along London Road, through Crookedholm and terminating at Hurlford. There had been proposed extensions along Portland Road, up John Finnie Street, West Langlands Street and eventually towards Crosshouse, but by this time, increasing costs and the far more flexible motor bus had made inroads and the trams ceased operation in 1926 during the General Strike. The council decided not to restart the service and the infrastructure was soon dismantled. Today the town is served by Kilmarnock railway station, which operates services from the town to all major locations in Scotland connecting with Stranraer for the ferries to the Port of Belfast as well as Larne Harbour in Northern Ireland and as far as Carlisle and Newcastle in England.

Kilmarnock has road links to Glasgow through the M77 motorway from Fenwick to its junction with the M8 at the Kingston Bridge. A south side motorway connects this point to the M74 near Calderpark when the latest phase of development is complete, eliminating some of the heavy traffic formerly travelling on the A71 through Hurlford, Galston, Newmilns, Darvel and Strathaven to join the M74 at Stonehouse. Stagecoach Group is the main transport provider in the town; it operates bus services to most major towns in the west of Scotland. Kilmarnock has its own bus station. As an early market town, Kilmarnock lies on the intersection of 3 main roads: the A71 which runs from Edinburgh to Irvine, the A76 from Dumfries, and the A77/M77 from Stranraer to Glasgow.

Kilmarnock has no international airport, however, the town, as well as surrounding settlements in the area, is served by nearby Glasgow Prestwick Airport (14 mi).

Education and learning 

Kilmarnock has one college, ten primary schools, three secondary schools and thirteen nursery schools. There is also a college in the town, Ayrshire College previously known as Kilmarnock College and prior to that Kilmarnock Technical College. The schools are managed by East Ayrshire Council.

The town's oldest secondary school Kilmarnock Academy dates back to the 1600s. The school in its present-day serves as a comprehensive school, which of three in Kilmarnock. It can trace its history back to the local burgh school founded in the 1630s and the first school to bear the name was established in 1807. Next to the school is the "Old Tech," formerly Kilmarnock Technical School, which opened in 1910 as part of the academy. It is also listed, but is no longer part of the school; it was closed in 1997 due to a reduction in student numbers, caused by a restructuring of educational resources in the area. The building remained closed, and reopened in 2006 as luxury housing, due to its prime location directly next to the Dick Institute, the town's primary library and museum, and the centre of town. In the art department at the school, there is a war memorial in memory of those who died in World War 1. Kilmarnock Academy is one of the few schools in the world to have educated two Nobel laureates: Alexander Fleming and John Boyd Orr (although only for four months, whereas his primary and secondary school career was at West Kilbride Public School). The foundation stone for Loanhead School in the town was laid in 1903 by Andrew Carnegie. The building was completed and opened in 1905, originally constructed to accommodate over 1,100 pupils who had completed and passed the qualifying exam for the school. Within a few years of the schools opening, the exam system was scrapped and the school became a primary school to which it remains to this day. Loanhead Primary School is a Category B listed building by Historic Environment Scotland and underwent a multi-mullion pound programme of investment between 2020−2021 to modernise the building and include provision for early years education within the town centre area of Kilmarnock.

St Joseph's Academy was founded in 1955 in its present location, built on what were the outskirts of Kilmarnock at the time. The adjacent New Farm Loch estate eventually grew and enveloped the school. The school comprised an extended single building, housing most of the subjects taught within. Due to a lack of space, an additional building, commonly referred to as 'A' Block, was erected in the 1970s. As the school was constructed on what was essentially fields, the St Joseph's campus included a large playing field, comprising a red blaes hockey pitch, running tracks, and space for 4 grass football pitches. St. Conval's High School was later annexed to St. Joseph's in October 1998 and became known as St. Joseph's Cumnock. In 2004 St. Joseph's Cumnock Campus was closed due to falling attendance figures, and the town's Catholic children now attend the new St. Joseph's Academy campus in Kilmarnock, which now serves the entire Secondary Catholic population of East Ayrshire. In the early 21st century, a programme was initiated by central government to upgrade secondary schools throughout the country using a mixture of public and private money.  St Joseph's was one of the schools selected for demolition and reconstruction, along with nearby Grange Academy. In 2008, the rebuilt St Joseph's was opened, including the new St Andrew's Primary – an amalgamation of the former feeder St Columba's and St Matthew's Primaries.

In recent times, East Ayrshire Council have demolished some of the town's oldest schools, such as the original Grange Academy along with St. Joseph's Academy, which have fallen into a state of disrepair and some of which have been hindered by falling pupil intakes. In September 2008, the new Grange Campus was completed and incorporated Grange Academy, Annanhill Primary, and Park School. The opening of the campus was delayed from August. The old Park School, Grange Academy and Annanhill Primary School buildings have been demolished.

Early Childhood Centres

 Cairns Early Childhood Centre
 Dean Park Nursery (private establishment in partnership with East Ayrshire Council)
 Flowerbank Early Childhood Centre
 Gaelic Early Childhood Centre
 Gargieston Early Childhood Centre
 Hillbank Early Childhood Centre
 James Hamilton Early Childhood Centre
 Onthank Early Childhood Centre
 Riccarton Early Childhood Centre
 Shortlees Early Childhood Centre
 St Andrew's Early Childhood Centre 
 Whatriggs Early Childhood Centre
 Loanhead Early Childhood Centre

Primary schools

 Annanhill Primary School
 Gargieston Primary School
 Hillhead Primary School
 Loanhead Primary School 
 James Hamilton Primary School
 Mount Carmel Primary School 
 Onthank Primary School
 Shortlees Primary School 
 St Andrew's Primary School 
 Whatriggs Primary School

Secondary schools
 Kilmarnock Academy 
 Grange Academy
 St Joseph's Academy

Special Schools
 Park School
 Willowbank School

Further education
 Ayrshire College (Kilmarnock Campus)

Sports 

The town is host to Kilmarnock F.C., a member of the Scottish Premiership and the  oldest professional football club in Scotland. Their home ground is Rugby Park. The location of the stadium came about by the works of Ross Quigley, whom at the time was one of the first directors of the club. The etymology of the ground is that when founded, the club played both football and rugby. Rugby Park was one of the first football grounds in Scotland to have floodlights installed. In recent years the stadium has been modernised, firstly to bring it in line with the all-seating regulations, then rebuilt totally to make a new ground. It has also hosted international football matches and music concerts, most recently Elton John in June 2005 and Rod Stewart in June 2016. The club's foundation dates back to the very earliest days of organised football in Scotland, when a group of local cricketers looking for a sporting pursuit to occupy them outwith the cricket season formed a football club in 1869. Originally they played rugby rules, but the difficulty in organising fixtures and the growing influence of Queen's Park soon persuaded them to adopt the association code instead. These origins are reflected to this day by the name of the club's home ground – Rugby Park.

Although not amongst the founder members of the Scottish Football Association in 1873, Kilmarnock F.C. did send a letter of stating their willingness to join and did so in time to compete in the inaugural Scottish Cup tournament in 1873–74. Their 2–0 defeat against Renton in the first round on 18 October 1873 is thought to have been the first match ever played in the competition. Kilmarnock joined the Scottish League in 1895 and after winning consecutive Second Division titles were elected to the top flight for the first time in 1899. The club's greatest success was in 1965 under the management of Willie Waddell. On the final day of the season, they travelled to face Hearts at Tynecastle requiring a victory by two goals to nil (due to the competition being decided by goal average at that period if teams were equal on points) to win the league at their opponents' expense. A 2–0 win saw Kilmarnock crowned Scottish League champions for the first, and to date only, time. This capped a period of strong consistency which had seen them occupy runners-up spot in four of the previous five seasons.

After a period of decline in the 1980s which saw the club relegated to the Second Division, Killie have returned to prominence, holding top division status since being promoted in 1993 and lifting the Scottish Cup for the third time in 1997 after a 1–0 victory over Falkirk in the final. In March 2012, Kilmarnock won the Scottish League Cup for the first time under the management of their manager Kenny Sheils, beating Celtic 1–0. Kilmarnock have qualified for European competitions on nine occasions, their best performance coming in the 1966–67 Fairs Cup when they progressed to the semi-finals, eventually being eliminated by Leeds United. The club have played in all three European competitions (European Cup, Cup Winners' Cup and the UEFA Cup).

There are two golf courses in the town, Annanhill Golf Course and Caprington Golf Course, which has both an 18-hole course and a 9-hole course. Both these courses are council owned and run by East Ayrshire Council. The local leisure complexes include the Galleon Centre: with a 25-metre swimming pool, baby pool, ice rink, squash courts, sauna, gym, games hall, bar area, bowling green and the New Northwest Centre (formerly the Hunter Centre) which contains a community gym and various local medical facilities. The new Ayrshire Athletics Centre was constructed in the Queens Drive area which includes a 400m running track outside of the main building.

Culture 

Kilmarnock boasts a large number of listed buildings. The Dick Institute, opened in April 1901, was severely damaged by fire only eight years after it opened. Some of the museums collections were lost in the fire. It reopened two years after the fire in 1911. The Dick Institute was used as an Auxiliary Hospital in 1917 during World War One. It is now shared by the Arts and Museums Service, and the Libraries, Registration and Information Service. The two Art Galleries and three Museum Galleries house permanent and temporary displays of Fine Art, Contemporary Art and Craft, Local and Industrial History and Natural Sciences. The Lending Library, Audio Library, Junior Library, Reference Library, and Learning Centre are all housed on the ground floor.

The first collection of work by Scottish poet Robert Burns, Poems, chiefly in Scots was published here in 1786. It was published at the current site of the Burn's Mall, dedicated to his work. This edition is known as the Kilmarnock Edition or Kilmarnock volume. The ancestors of William Wallace held the Barony of Ricarton, where the suburb of Riccarton is now located, and, according to local tradition, Wallace was born at Ellerslie near Kilmarnock.

John Bowring, polyglot and fourth governor of Hong Kong, was Member of Parliament for Kilmarnock in 1835. In the castle of Kilmarnock, Dean Castle, there is an exhibition of armour and weapons, and the Van Raalte collection of musical instruments.

In popular culture 

Kilmarnock was voted the "UK's Friendliest Shopping Town" in 2006. In 2010, BBC Scotland filmed residents on the town's Onthank and Longpark area for the TV programme The Scheme which broadcast in 2010 for two episodes so far, out of a planned four. The Scheme caused much controversy within residents of the community, who believed that the BBC only showed the "worst parts", leading to others believing that they were "pretty much the same". The series has been the subject of media criticism, with the series being labelled as "poverty porn" and described as giving a "misleading impression" of life on the estate. The final two episodes of the series were never broadcast due to legal issues.

In 2015, Kilmarnock was named 'Scotland's Most Improved Town' at the Scottish Urban Regeneration Forum awards. The panel recognised the improvements made to the town centre of Kilmarnock due to a £43 million investment, and local authority intervention to restore derelict buildings including the former Johnnie Walker bond building and the Opera House.

Scottish singers The Proclaimers titled a song "The Joyful Kilmarnock Blues" on their first album, This Is the Story, released in 1987.

The song "The Ballroom Blitz" by the band The Sweet was inspired by an event at the town's Grand Hall music venue, when, in 1973, the band were performing at the venue and were driven off the stage by a barrage of bottles thrown from the crowd. The song went onto achieve worldwide fame and success, reaching the top ten on both the UK Singles Charts and the Billboard Hot 100 singles charts, with many still talking about the concept behind the song.

In October 2022, the town's Grand Hall played host to the 2022 BBC New Comedy Award.

Notable people and residents

Below is a list of those who have either been born, lived in or have been associated with the town of Kilmarnock at some point of their life:

Literature and arts
 Gilbert Adair; writer
 Dave Allsop; writer, artist and role-playing games designer.
Robert Colquhoun; painter, printmaker and theatre set designer
Steven Cree, actor, best known for his role in Outlander and Outlaw King. 
Fatherson, three piece alternative rock band formed in the town, with the three members having resided in the town and been educated at local schools in Kilmarnock
Clark Sorley, record producer 
James Prime, member of the band Deacon Blue
James Buckley who starred as Jay Cartwright in The Inbetweeners resided in Kilmarnock for a period of time with his wife.
John Kelso Hunter; 19th-century oil painter and author.
Ben and James Johnston, drummer and bassist of Scottish rock band Biffy Clyro
Chris Kelso; writer, illustrator, editor and journalist, born 1988.
Kirsty McCabe; weather presenter and meteorologist BBC, ITV, Channel 5 and Sky News.
Malky McCormick; cartoonist.
Iain McDowall; crime writer.
Hugh McIlvanney; sports journalist.
William McIlvanney; writer, born 1936 and known for his series of books Laidlaw
James McKie was a printer and publisher with premises in King Street. He published the first facsimile edition of Poems, Chiefly in the Scottish Dialect and in the 19th century had the world's largest collection of Burnsiana.
Lindsay McKenzie; actress
Colin Mochrie; Scottish-Canadian comedian (of Whose Line is it Anyway? fame) born in Kilmarnock in 1957
William and John Sloane; founders of W. & J. Sloane in New York City.
Mike Ogletree; drummer and percussionist
Kirsty Wark; TV news journalist and presenter of Newsnight 
Thomas Gardiner, California newspaperman.

Medicine and science
John Boyd Orr; biologist, politician and Nobel Peace Prize-winner.
Alexander Fleming; (1881–1955), discoverer of penicillin and winner of the Nobel Prize in Physiology or Medicine attended Kilmarnock Academy.
Robert Thomson Leiper, parasitologist and helminthologist

Businesspeople
Alexander Walker; creator of Johnnie Walker Scotch Whisky (1837–1889), Son of John "Johnnie" Walker.
John "Johnnie" Walker; Originator of Johnnie Walker Whisky, Grocer, and Father of Alexander Walker (1805–1857).
Marie Macklin CBE, CEO of The KLIN Group and founder of The HALO Urban Regeneration
Gareth Kirkwood; former director of operations at British Airways, current CEO of The Nurture Landscapes Group.

Politics
Des Browne; former MP, UK defence minister and Scotland minister.
Willie Coffey; local MSP.
Ian Deans; Scottish-Canadian NDP politician representing Hamilton, Ontario.
James Shaw; Lord Mayor of London in 1805.

Sports

Joanne Calderwood; flyweight mixed martial artist in the Ultimate Fighting Championship.
Margaret McDowall; member of the Scottish swimming team and silver medal winner at the 1952 Helsinki Olympics.
Hugh McIlvanney; sports journalist.
David Robertson; played for Kilmarnock and Queen of the South before emigrating to New York where he played for the U.S. National team.
David Stevenson (1890–1974), cricketer
Gordon Smith; former professional footballer and former SFA Chief Executive.
Major General Sir Robert Murdoch Smith (1835–1900), engineer, archaeologist and diplomat
Jim Thomson (born 1940), cricketer
Patrick James McKay (29 May 1957) Karate-World champion.
Billy Gilmour, footballer for Chelsea F.C. and attended Grange Academy in the town
Gareth Kirkwood (born 1963), cricketer

Merchants
William Cunninghame, 18th century merchant and Tobacco Lord.
 John Allan (1779, Kilmarnock – 1834, Richmond, Virginia, United States); merchant and foster father of Edgar Allan Poe
Charles Ewart; cavalryman who captured a French regimental eagle at the Battle of Waterloo

Religion

William Hewitt; Moderator of the General Assembly of the Church of Scotland in 2009
David Lacy; Moderator of the General Assembly of the Church of Scotland and a local minister.
Rev Dr James Lindsay, theological author

Military
Eleanor Kasrils; first woman recruited into the African National Congress military wing.

Other notable people from Kilmarnock
Duncan Millar, recipient of the Victoria Cross
Robert Reyburn, orchardist, farmer and politician

Twin towns – sister cities
Kilmarnock – as part of East Ayrshire Council – is twinned with five cities and has received awards from the Council of Europe for its work in twinning. 
 Alès, France; 
 Herstal, Belgium; 
 Joué-lès-Tours, France; 
 Kulmbach, Germany; 
 Santa Coloma de Gramenet, Spain. 
The former Kilmarnock and Loudoun District Council is also twinned with Sukhum, Abkhazia (Russian-occupied Georgia) on the Black Sea coast.
 Following a review of links this link is now considered as a friendship link.

See also
 Dudsday – the old Kilmarnock hiring fair
 The Holy Tulzie – the Rev. John Russell of the High Kirk

References

Bibliography 

 Beattie, Frank (1994) Greetings from Kilmarnock, Ochiltree: R. Stenlake, 
 Beattie, Frank (2003) Kilmarnock Memories, Sutton Publishing, 
 Brinkhoff, T. (2007) City Population: Great Britain and Northern Ireland: Scotland, Online statistics (Retrieved 8 July 2007)
 Malkin, John (1989) Pictorial History of Kilmarnock, Darvel: Alloway, 
 Smellie, Thomas (1898) Sketches of Old Kilmarnock, Section II, limited edition of 250 copies, Kilmarnock: Dunlop & Drennan

External links 

 YouTube video of Kilmarnock Junction, Station and Wabtec Rail works
The History of Kilmarnock by Archibald McKay, 1858
Commentary and video on the 1848 murder of James Young.
Video and commentary on the death of Lord Soulis & the Soulis Cross
The Lordship and Barony of Kilmarnock
The Old Riccarton Bridge – video
Webcams of the town
Kilmarnock F.C.
2001 census key statistics for Kilmarnock
Kilmarnock College
The Blacksyke Tower beam engine house
Author details | Scottish Book Trust
BFI | Sight & Sound | One elephant, two elephant: That Sinking Feeling and Gregory’s Girl

 
Large burghs
Towns in East Ayrshire
Railway towns in Scotland